Government House is the name of many of the official residences of governors-general, governors and lieutenant-governors in the Commonwealth and the remaining colonies of the British Empire. The name is also used in some other countries.

Government Houses in the Commonwealth of Nations

Anguilla

 Government House, Old Ta is the official residence of the governor of Anguilla.

Antigua and Barbuda

 Government House, St. John's is the official residence of the Governor-General of Antigua and Barbuda.

Australia

 Government House, Canberra, commonly known as Yarralumla, is the official residence of the Governor General of Australia.  
 Admiralty House, Kirribilli is the Governor General's official residence in Sydney. 
 Government Houses for the state Governors exist also in each state and the Northern Territory:
 Government House, Sydney in New South Wales
 Government House, Melbourne in Victoria; between 1901 and 1930 used by the Governor-General 
 Government House, Brisbane in Queensland
 Old Government House, Queensland, used between 1862 and 1909
 Government House, Norfolk Island, residence of the Administrator of Norfolk Island
 Government House, Perth in Western Australia
 Government House, Adelaide in South Australia
 Government House, Hobart in Tasmania
 Government House, Darwin in the Northern Territory
 Government House, West Island in the Cocos (Keeling) Islands

The Bahamas

 Government House, Duke Street, Nassau is the official residence of the Governor General of the Bahamas, and formerly of the Governor of the Bahamas.

Barbados

 Government House is the former name of State House, the official residence of the President of Barbados. It is located on Government Hill, St. Michael, Barbados.

Belize
 Belize House, Belmopan is the official residence of the Governor-General of Belize.
 Government House, Belmopan was the official residence of the former Governors of British Honduras (later Governors of Belize) and used by the Governor-General of Belize between 1981 and 1984. The building is now the Museum of Culture.

Bermuda

 Government House, Hamilton is the official residence of the Governor of Bermuda.

The British Virgin Islands

 Government House, Road Town, Tortola is the official residence of the Governor of the British Virgin Islands.

Canada

 Rideau Hall (officially Government House) in Ottawa is the official residence of the monarch and Governor General of Canada.
 Citadelle of Quebec in Quebec City, Quebec, is a second official residence for the monarch and governor general and is normally occupied for several weeks each year.    
 Government Houses or official residences for the provincial lieutenant governors exist also in most provinces.

The Cayman Islands

Government House, Seven Mile Beach, Grand Cayman is the official residence of the Governor of the Cayman Islands.

Dominica

Government House, Roseau is the official residence of the President of Dominica.

The Falkland Islands

Government House, Stanley is the residence of the Governor of the Falkland Islands. It was the scene of a battle with Argentine troops during the 1982 invasion.

Fiji

Government House, Suva is located on Victoria Parade, Suva. It is the home of the President of Fiji and was built in 1928 to replace the original building – the residence of the colonial governor – which burnt to the ground after being struck by lightning in 1921.

The Gambia

Government House is the former name of State House, the official residence of the President of the Gambia.

Gilbert and Ellice Islands

A Government House of Gilbert and Ellice Islands was created in South Tarawa on 1 January 1972. It became the Presidential Residency of Kiribati on 12 July 1979.

Guyana

Government House is the former name of State House, which is the official residence of the President of Guyana.

Hong Kong

Government House, Hong Kong is located on Government Hill in the Central, Hong Kong of Hong Kong Island and the official residence of the Chief executive of Hong Kong.

India

Rashtrapati Bhavan was originally Government House, New Delhi. It was built as a residence for the Viceroy of India. From 1947 until 1950, it was the residence of the Governor-General of India. Since 1950, the President of India has lived in this building.

Raj Bhavan, Kolkata was the Viceroy's residence until capital of India shifted from Calcutta to New Delhi in 1911, when the Governor of Bengal moved in.

The Isle of Man

Government House, Governor's Road, Onchan is the official residence of the Lieutenant Governor Vice Admiral Sir Paul Haddacks, Her Majesty's representative on the Island.

Jamaica

King's House, Jamaica, is also known as Government House.

Jersey

Government House, St Saviour is the official residence of the Lieutenant Governor of Jersey (currently Lieutenant-General Sir Andrew Ridgway). It is also the official residence of the Duke of Normandy (currently King Charles III) as head of state when staying in Jersey.

Kenya

Government House is the former name of State House, which is the official residence of the President and First Lady of Kenya.

Mauritius

Le Réduit, the official residence of the former Governors and Governors-General of Mauritius, was also known as Government House from 1810 until 1992. Since then, it has been called State House and is the official residence of the President of Mauritius.

Montserrat

 Government House, Woodlands is the official residence of the Governor of Montserrat.

New Zealand

Government House, Wellington is the primary residence of the Governor-General of New Zealand. There is a second house in Auckland, Government House, Auckland.

Official Link: Governor-General of New Zealand

Nigeria
Government House, Port Harcourt is the official residence of the
Governor of Rivers State.

Pakistan

 Government House of Baluchistan in Quetta.
 Government House of Khyber Pakhtunkhwa in Peshawar.
 Government House of Punjab in Lahore.
 Government House of Sindh in Karachi.

Saint Kitts and Nevis

 Government House, Basseterre, Saint Kitts, is the official residence of the Governor-General of Saint Kitts and Nevis.

Saint Lucia

 Government House, Morne Fortune is the official residence of the Governor-General of Saint Lucia.

Sierra Leone

Government House is the former name of State House, the official residence of the President of Sierra Leone.

Singapore

Government House – Former residence of Stamford Raffles and the Governors of Singapore at Government Hill, Singapore, demolished in 1859 and a replica of it currently stands on its former site.
Government House of Singapore – Currently The Istana, the official residence of President of Singapore.
Pavilion - Former Government House from 1859 - 1861.

South Africa

Trinidad and Tobago

Government House is the former name of President's House, which is the official residence of the President of Trinidad and Tobago.

Government Houses outside the Commonwealth of Nations

Armenia
 Government House, Yerevan

Azerbaijan

Government House, Baku, is a government building housing various state ministries of Azerbaijan. It is located on Neftchiler Avenue and faces the Baku Boulevard. From 1924 to 1927, construction of several large government buildings was planned and included in the budget of Baku. In 1934, the Soviet authorities announced a tender for the construction of the Baku Soviet Palace (later renamed the Government House).
The Presidential Palace houses the executive administration of the President of Azerbaijan. The office is in charge of fulfilling the constitutional responsibilities of the President. The building is located on Istiglaliyyat Street of the capital city, Baku. Built in 1971, it was occupied by the Central Committee of the Communist Party of Azerbaijan. After the restoration of Azerbaijan's independence in 1991, the building was assigned to the President of Azerbaijan and his administration. It was renamed the Presidential Palace in 2003.

Bahrain
Government House, Manama

Belarus
Government House, Minsk

Hong Kong
 Government House, Hong Kong, is located on Government Hill, Central, on Hong Kong Island. It was the official residence of most of the Governors of Hong Kong during British administration. After 1997, its status as the official residence of the head of the Hong Kong Government was abolished and has been used as a place for mere ceremonial uses. However, when Sir Donald Tsang became the Chief executive of Hong Kong, he reverted it and designated the House as the official residence and office. He moved into the House at the end of January 2006.

Jerusalem
The Palace of the Commissioner in Jerusalem is the former headquarters of the government of the British Mandate of Palestine until 1948, and has since June 1948 been the headquarters of the United Nations Truce Supervision Organization.

Moldova
Government House, Chișinău

Thailand

Government House of Thailand – Not an official residence, but the headquarters of the Office of the Prime Minister of Thailand.

Ukraine

Government House, Lviv, Ukraine – formerly the seat of the Kingdom of Galicia and Lodomeria, a province of the Austro-Hungarian Empire

United States

Some gubernatorial residences in the United States of America are also named Government House:
Government House (St. Augustine), listed on the NRHP in Florida
Government House (Maryland)
Government House (New York City), intended to be the official residence for President George Washington, demolished in 1815
Government House (American Samoa), a National Historic Landmark

Zimbabwe
Government House, Harare, (now called State House) the official residence of the President of Zimbabwe
Government House, Bulawayo, (now called State House) the official residence in Bulawayo

See also
Official residence
Government Houses of the British Empire and Commonwealth
Governor's Mansion (disambiguation)

References